High Heat is a 2022 action film directed by Zach Golden with a screenplay written by James Pedersen. The film stars Olga Kurylenko and Don Johnson. The film was released on December 16, 2022, both in theaters and streaming platforms.

Synopsis
Ray and Ana, husband and wife, own and operate a restaurant together on their opening night. Both of them are keeping secrets, however. Ray is in debt to the Mafia, while Ana is an ex-KGB agent. Both secrets are revealed when the Mafia sends people to kill Ray but Ana fights them off. Ray and Ana must work together to save their restaurant and their lives.

Cast
 Olga Kurylenko as Ana
 Don Johnson as Ray
 Kaitlin Doubleday as Mimi
 Chris Diamantopoulos as Tom
 Dallas Page as Dom
 Bianca D'Ambrosio as Becky
 Chiara D'Ambrosio as Kaitlyn
 Ivan Martin as Mick
 Jackie Long as Gary
 Dylan Flashner as Sebastian

Production
In October 2021, it was announced that filming wrapped.

Release
In March 2022, it was announced that the world rights to the film were acquired by Saban Films.  The film was released in theaters and on Demand and on Digital on December 16, 2022.

Reception
The film has a 56% rating on Rotten Tomatoes based on nine reviews.

Nadir Samara of Screen Rant awarded the film two stars out of five and wrote, "The cast is full of familiar faces, but even they can’t save High Heat. Though well-constructed, there isn’t anything special about the film."

Josh Bell of Comic Book Resources praised Johnson's performance, calling it "a pleasant surprise amid the steady stream of forgettable action B-movies."

Joe Leydon of Variety gave the film a positive review, calling it "a hoot."

Julian Roman of MovieWeb also gave the film a positive review and wrote, "High Heat serves up wacky action-comedy like a fast food platter(...)Hilarious supporting characters add entertainment value when the lean premise struggles.  Decent gunplay coupled with slick fight scenes also bolster meager the narrative."

References

External links
 
 

American action films
2022 films
2022 action films
2020s American films